Peroxides are a group of chemical compounds.

Peroxide may also refer to:

Chemistry

Inorganic chemistry
 Hydrogen peroxide, the simplest peroxide
 High-test peroxide (HTP), a highly concentrated solution of hydrogen peroxide
 solid hydrogen peroxide
Inorganic peroxy acids, mineral acid derivatives containing an acidic –OOH group

Organic chemistry
Organic peroxide, organic compounds containing the peroxide functional group (ROOR')
Organic peracids, carboxylic acid derivatives containing an acidic –OOH group

Other
Peroxide (punk zine), a 1970s magazine
Peroxide (Nina Nesbitt album), 2014
Peroxide blond, a variety of artificially blond hair

See also